Jürgen Schmidhuber (born 17 January 1963) is a German computer scientist noted for his work in the field of artificial intelligence, specifically artificial neural networks. He is a scientific director of the Dalle Molle Institute for Artificial Intelligence Research in Switzerland.

He is best known for his foundational and highly-cited work on long short-term memory (LSTM), a type of neural network architecture which went on to become the dominant technique for various natural language processing tasks in research and commercial applications in the 2010s.

Career
Schmidhuber completed his undergraduate (1987) and PhD (1991) studies at the Technical University of Munich in Munich, Germany. His PhD advisors were Wilfried Brauer and Klaus Schulten. He taught there from 2004 until 2009. From 2009, until 2021, he was a professor of artificial intelligence at the Università della Svizzera Italiana in Lugano, Switzerland.

He has served as the director of Dalle Molle Institute for Artificial Intelligence Research (IDSIA), a Swiss AI lab, since 1995.

In 2014, Schmidhuber formed a company, Nnaisense, to work on commercial applications of artificial intelligence in fields such as finance, heavy industry and self-driving cars. Sepp Hochreiter, Jaan Tallinn, and Marcus Hutter are advisers to the company. Sales were under US$11 million in 2016; however, Schmidhuber states that the current emphasis is on research and not revenue. Nnaisense raised its first round of capital funding in January 2017. Schmidhuber's overall goal is to create an all-purpose AI by training a single AI in sequence on a variety of narrow tasks.

Research

Schmidhuber may be best known for his early research on the long short-term memory (LSTM), a type of recurrent neural network. The LSTM was developed by Sepp Hochreiter and initially reported on in his 1991 diploma thesis which analyzed and overcame the famous vanishing gradient problem. The name LSTM was introduced in a tech report (1995) 
leading to the most cited LSTM publication (1997), co-authored by Hochreiter and Schmidhuber. Schmidhuber, Hochreiter, and Schmidhuber's other students, including Felix Gers, Fred Cummins, and Alex Graves, and others, Schmidhuber published increasingly sophisticated versions of the LSTM.

The standard LSTM architecture which is used in almost all current applications 
was introduced in 2000. Today's "vanilla LSTM" using backpropagation through time was published in 2005, and its connectionist temporal classification (CTC) training algorithm in 2006. CTC enabled end-to-end speech recognition with LSTM. By the 2010s, the LSTM became the dominant technique for a variety of natural language processing tasks including speech recognition and machine translation, and was widely implemented in commercial technologies such as Google Translate and Siri. Since 2018, transformers have overtaken the LSTM as the dominant neural network architecture in natural language processing. 

In 2011, Schmidhuber's team at IDSIA with his postdoc Dan Ciresan also achieved dramatic speedups of convolutional neural networks (CNNs) on fast parallel computers called GPUs. An earlier CNN on GPU by Chellapilla et al. (2006) was 4 times faster than an equivalent implementation on CPU. The deep CNN of Dan Ciresan et al. (2011) at IDSIA was already 60 times faster and achieved the first superhuman performance in a computer vision contest in August 2011. Between 15 May 2011 and 10 September 2012, their fast and deep CNNs won no fewer than four image competitions. They also significantly improved on the best performance in the literature for multiple image databases. The approach has become central to the field of computer vision. It is based on CNN designs introduced much earlier by Yann LeCun et al. (1989) who applied the backpropagation algorithm to a variant of Kunihiko Fukushima's original CNN architecture called neocognitron, later modified by J. Weng's method called max-pooling.

Credit disputes
Schmidhuber has controversially argued that he and other researchers have been denied adequate recognition for their contribution to the field of deep learning, in favour of better known researchers, particularly Geoffrey Hinton, Yoshua Bengio and Yann LeCun, who shared the 2018 Turing Award for their foundational work in deep learning. He wrote a "scathing" 2015 article arguing that Hinton, Bengio and Lecun "heavily cite each other" but "fail to credit the pioneers of the field".

Schmidhuber has suggested that other researchers have borrowed or stolen his ideas, and he has been described as having the tendency of publicly confronting fellow researchers with these charges. In a statement to the New York Times, Yann LeCun wrote that "Jürgen is manically obsessed with recognition and keeps claiming credit he doesn't deserve for many, many things... It causes him to systematically stand up at the end of every talk and claim credit for what was just presented, generally not in a justified manner." Some have suggested that Schmidhuber's accomplishments have been downplayed because of his personality.

Recognition 

Schmidhuber received the Helmholtz Award of the International Neural Network Society in 2013, and the Neural Networks Pioneer Award of the IEEE Computational Intelligence Society in 2016 for "pioneering contributions to deep learning and neural networks." He is a member of the European Academy of Sciences and Arts.

References 

Living people
Artificial intelligence researchers
Machine learning researchers
Computer scientists
Members of the European Academy of Sciences and Arts
Technical University of Munich alumni
Academic staff of the Technical University of Munich
Academic staff of the University of Lugano
1963 births